Boolite is a small wheat farming locality near Warracknabeal in Victoria, Australia.

The locality had a hall that was used for dancing, fairs and concerts.  There was a local school which had an annual picnic, and flower day. Furthermore, the school was able to raise significant funds for the war effort during the Great War. Boolite competed for the Emmett trophy in Australian football against other towns in the area. The locality also participated in cricket. Today, little of Boolite remains.

References

Towns in Victoria (Australia)
Wimmera